Henry Charles Sirr (1807-1872) was a British lawyer, diplomat and writer. He graduated at Trinity College, Dublin and became a barrister at Lincoln's Inn, London. Eventually he went into government service, working as Deputy Queen's Advocate for the Southern Circuit of Ceylon (modern Sri Lanka) in the mid-19th century.

He was the son of Henry Charles Sirr, Town Major of Dublin and Eliza D'Arcy. His older brother was Rev Joseph D'Arcy Sirr.

He is perhaps best known for writing Ceylon and the Cingalese, a book published in two volumes in 1850 covering "their History, Government and Religion; the Antiquities, Institutions, Revenue and Capabilities of the Island; and a full Account of the late Rebellion; with Anecdotes illustrating the Manners and Customs of the People." The book was widely regarded as an authoritative account of life in Ceylon. It was
cited by Jules Verne in his classic Twenty Thousand Leagues Under the Sea; in chapter 2, the book's narrator Professor Aronnax tells the reader that while searching for a description of Ceylon in Captain Nemo's library aboard the Nautilus, "I found a book by H.C. Sirr, Esq, entitled Ceylon and the Cingalese."

He came Secretary of the Anglo-Portuguese Commission from 1842 to 1843 and then served as British Vice-Consul at Hong Kong in 1843. He described his experiences in another book, China and the Chinese, subtitled: "Their religion, character, customs and manufactures; the evils arising from the opium trade; with a glance at our religious, moral, political and commercial intercourse with the country." The book provides important contemporary insights into the nature of the opium trade and the endemic smuggling that took place in the Pearl River region.

Sirr, along with Paul Ivy Sterling was one of the first two barristers admitted to practice before the Supreme Court of Hong Kong at its first sitting on 1 October 1844.

In 1859 he met and married Louis Rix in London.

Arms

References

External links
 Article on the father, has information on the son at the end.

Colonial Legal Service officers
English barristers
Members of Lincoln's Inn
British travel writers
British Ceylon period
1807 births
1872 deaths
People from British Hong Kong